Therese Wittman (1869–1942) was a French composer. She wrote piano and vocal music, which was published by Ascherberg, Hopwood & Crew Ltd; Casa Ricordi; and Emile Leduc P Bertrand & Cie.

Works
Her works include:

Piano
Air de Ballet 
Au Fil de l'Eau
Baby Dollar
Dear Alice (dance)
Fleur d'Hiver  (waltz)
Historiete Petit Valse
Je t'Adore
Laments (waltz)
Maman, souvenir (march)
March des Jolies Parisiennes
March Ecossaise
Petit Rondo
Valse Triomphale

Vocal 
Bateau des Amours
Du Coeur (words by Henri De Gorse, music by Thérèse Wittman)
Pauv' Boscotte
Sorellina
Trois Petites Misses

References 

French women composers
1869 births
1942 deaths
French composers